Jubail Industrial City, the world's largest industrial city, was established in 1975 and is located in the Eastern Province of Saudi Arabia. It covers 1,016 square kilometers and includes industrial complexes and port facilities. It contributes to about 7% of Saudi Arabia's GDP.

The city was constructed by the US-based Bechtel Corporation starting from 1976. The construction project was further expanded until 2021 with cost of $20 Billion.

References 

1975 establishments in Saudi Arabia
Industry in Saudi Arabia